David William Blair (born 14 July 1985) is a Scottish former rugby union player who played Stand Off and played for Sale Sharks from 2003 to 2007 and then Edinburgh Gunners in the Magners League from 2007 to 2011. Blair was captain and the highest points scorer for Scotland Under 21 in the team's history. He is the younger brother of Scotland captain Mike Blair who also plays for Edinburgh, as did a third brother Alex. David Blair started at Sale Sharks and then moved to Edinburgh to join up with his brother. David has also represented Scotland A team on several occasions.

An injury to Phil Godman in September 2010 made him the first choice standoff for Edinburgh. He started with a man of the match performance to beat Leinster.

References

1985 births
Living people
Scottish rugby union players
Rugby union players from Edinburgh
Edinburgh Rugby players
Scottish schoolteachers
Alumni of the University of Stirling
Rugby union fullbacks
Rugby union fly-halves